Barbara on Her Own is a 1926 mystery novel by the British writer Edgar Wallace.

Plot
The owner of a struggling department store is found dead, shortly before a controversial takeover. Barbara, his goddaughter and secretary, is suspected by the police of murder.

References

Bibliography
 Clark, Neil. Stranger than Fiction: The Life of Edgar Wallace, the Man Who Created King Kong. Stroud, Gloucestershire: The History Press, 2015.

External links
 Barbara on Her Own at Project Gutenberg Australia

1926 British novels
British mystery novels
Novels about murder
Novels by Edgar Wallace
George Newnes Ltd books